A circulation plan is a schematic empirical projection/model of how people and/or vehicles flow through a given area.

Types
Circulation plans are used by i.e. by city planners and other officials (such as county planning officials, ...) to manage and monitor traffic and pedestrian patterns in such a way that they might discover how to make future improvements to the system.

New multi-family residential developments, for example, introduce increased volume (and thus density) of traffic flows into their vicinity. City planners might analyze this projected impact and justify charging higher impact fees. In other cases, local residents lobbying against a new development might use circulation plans to justify the denial of a development's building permit, citing decreased quality due to overcrowding, noise pollution, traffic, and so on.

Good city planners do their best to use main thoroughfares and so on to draw commuter traffic out of local neighborhoods (where excessive traffic is seen by local voters as undesirable) and onto larger roads, which often utilize considerable buffers like setback land and vegetation to divorce non-local (commuter) traffic from local (neighborhood) traffic.

The planning for internal circulation of people is also important in buildings. Signage can help with wayfinding and should be located at decision points and perpendicular to the path of travel.

Examples
In Ghent, Belgium, a circulation plan has been initiated Some streets that were previously two-way streets have been converted to one-way streets. The space that has thus become available has often been used to implement bicycle lanes and/or (widened) sidewalks.
The transition to carfree has significantly reduced traffic congestion and increased the use of other modes of transport, such as bikes and public transportation. Sections exist where cars can drive as well as sections that are car-free.
In some sections, public transport, taxis and permit holders may enter but they may not exceed 20 km/h.  A parking route exists around the city center, employing a parking guidance system to ensure access to all parts of the city and underground parking garages.

See also 

City Planning
Impact fees
One-way traffic
Road sign
Setback (land use)
Social distancing
Supermarket
Urban planning
Zoning

References

External links
 City of Duluth Traffic Circulation Plan
 City of Placerville Pedestrian Circulation Plan

Road traffic management